Burning Rubber is a 1981 feature film starring musician Alan Longmuir (of the Bay City Rollers) and Olivia Pascal.  Longmuir plays Henry Carsten, a race car driver.  The picture was filmed in South Africa.  Three other former members of the Bay City Rollers are also in the cast.

References

External links
 

1981 films
1981 action films
West German films
Bay City Rollers
English-language German films
Films directed by Norman Cohen
Films shot in South Africa
German auto racing films
1980s English-language films
1980s German films